Vachellia abyssinica, the flat top acacia, is a tree up to 16 m tall.

Description
Its bark is reddish-brown on older trees.  On younger trees it is pale yellowish-brown, peeling off in papery wads. Young twigs are softly hairy. Thorns are aligned in straight pairs at nodes. Leaves are in pinnae pairs of 20-40; the leaflets are very small, up to 4 × 0.75 mm. The inflorescence is arranged in white spherical heads. The involucel is located in the lower half of the peduncle. Seed pods are dehiscent.

Distribution 
From Ethiopia southwards to Zimbabwe and Mozambique and westwards to Angola.

References 

abyssinica
Flora of East Tropical Africa
Flora of Northeast Tropical Africa
Flora of South Tropical Africa
Flora of West Tropical Africa
Flora of West-Central Tropical Africa